James Augustus Johnson (May 16, 1829 – May 11, 1896) was an American politician. He served as a U.S. representative from California; who went on to serve as the state's 14th Lieutenant Governor.

Early life
Johnson was born May 16, 1829 in Spartanburg, South Carolina. When he was quite young he moved with his parents to Arkansas where he attended the common schools. He moved to California in 1853. He studied medicine and was graduated from Jefferson Medical College in Philadelphia, Pennsylvania. He then studied law and was admitted to the bar in 1859, then commenced the practice of law in Downieville, California.

Political career
Johnson served as a member of the California State Assembly in 1859 and 1860, representing Sierra County. He was elected as a Democrat to the U.S. House of Representatives for the Fortieth and Forty-first U.S. Congresses, serving from March 4, 1867, until March 3, 1871. He served as Lieutenant Governor of California from 1875 until 1880. After leaving office he moved to San Francisco. He served as registrar of voters in 1883 and 1884.

Death
He continued practicing law until his death on May 11, 1896 in San Francisco, at age 66. He was interred in the Masonic Cemetery, and in 1931 was re-interred in Woodlawn Memorial Park Cemetery in Colma, California.

References

External links

1829 births
1896 deaths
California lawyers
Democratic Party California state senators
Lieutenant Governors of California
Democratic Party members of the United States House of Representatives from California
Democratic Party members of the California State Assembly
People from Sierra County, California
Politicians from Spartanburg, South Carolina
19th-century American politicians
19th-century American lawyers
Burials at Woodlawn Memorial Park Cemetery (Colma, California)
Burials at Masonic Cemetery (San Francisco)